Bubblicious is a brand of bubble gum originally produced by the American Chicle Division of Warner-Lambert. The brand is now part of Cadbury Adams, a division of Mondelez International. It was launched in 1977, in response to the tremendous sales of Bubble Yum, the first soft bubble gum. The brand struggled upon introduction, but sales took off with the advent, in 1978,  of the "Ultimate Bubble" advertising campaign. Bubblicious was later expanded internationally.

Flavors
There have been 28 flavors of Bubblicious, 10 of which have been discontinued. Flavors have included Cotton Candy, Paradise Punch, Sour Cherry, and Choco Choco Chip. Bubblicious is available in original format and Bubblicious Bursts with a liquid-filled center.

The original "Lightning Lemonade" flavor was discontinued in the year 2000. However, in 2005 the flavor was re-introduced as LeBron's Lightning Lemonade, based on a partnership between Bubblicious and basketball player LeBron James. The caricature featured on the packaging was illustrated by cartoonist Grey Blackwell. When the flavor was re-introduced, it was changed to include a raspberry flavor element.

"Bubblicious Ink'd!" was a somewhat sour flavor the coloring of which caused the chewer's tongue to turn blue.  The flavor was supported by Cartoon Network's Klik Street Skaters' Group, who performed a commercial similar to the company's original Ink'd! commercial.

Bubblicious Sherbet ice cream is made by Breyers with bubble gum pieces and a bubble gum swirl.

Trivia
Bubblicious holds the Guinness World Records for the most bubble gum bubbles blown at one time.   Hundreds of Little League players and fans joined Major League Baseball Hall of Famer Ozzie Smith to set the world record with over 100 fans and 300 pieces of Bubblicious gum.

In June 2013, former New England Patriots Tight End Aaron Hernandez was linked to a murder by his purchase of Blue Cotton Candy Bubblicious.

References

Brand name confectionery
Cadbury Adams brands
Chewing gum
Mondelez International brands
Products introduced in 1977